William Deidrick was an American inventor from Selma, California. He was a co-inventor of the Fresno Scraper, the machine that became the basis of most modern earth-moving equipment. On April 17, 1883, Deidrick received U.S. Patent 275,893 for his horse-drawn scraper, which was a variation on the Buck Scraper, invented by James Porteous of Fresno, California. Porteous, originally a manufacturer of wagons, purchased Deidrick's patent, and also one held jointly by Frank Dusy and Abijah McCall as he perfected the machine, an important tool in the building of the Panama Canal, among many other uses.

References

Year of birth missing
Year of death missing
19th-century American inventors
People from Selma, California